Sir Hugh Low,  (10 May 182418 April 1905) was a British colonial administrator and naturalist. After a long residence in various colonial roles in Labuan, he was appointed as British administrator in the Malay Peninsula where he made the first trials of Hevea rubber in the region. He is often considered the first successful British administrator in the region, whose methods became models for subsequent British colonial operation in the entire South East Asia Region.

He made the first documented ascent of Mount Kinabalu in 1851. Both Kinabalu's highest peak as well as the deep gully on the northern side of the mountain are named after him.

Early life
Low was born in Upper Clapton, England, the son of a Scottish horticulturist, also named Hugh. At an early age, he acquired botanical expertise working in the family nursery. At 20, his father sent him on a collecting expedition to Southeast Asia. He based himself in Singapore but soon joined James Brooke, the White Rajah, in Sarawak. In the months following he became well enough acquainted with interior of Sarawak to write a definitive book on it on his return home. In 1847, Brooke was appointed Governor of the recently established British colony of Labuan and Consul General of Borneo. He made Low his Colonial Secretary (18481850) and William Napier Esq., Lieutenant Governor. They, and Napier's daughter, Catherine, returned to the Far East in 1848.

Labuan
Low married Catherine Napier when they reached Singapore on 12 August 1848 at St Andrew's Cathedral They had a son Hugh "Hugo" Brooke Low (18491887) and a daughter Catherine "Kitty" Elizabeth Low (18501923[?]). The marriage ended with the death of Catherine from fever in Labuan on 1851. Low buried her and 14 other fever victims at night in his garden of new Government House (known to locals as Bumbung 12, Malay: "twelve roofs") which he designed, due to fear of the potential headhunting by the Dayaks ransacking of graves as they had earlier done at the Christian cemetery. The children were taken care of by their grandfather and uncle.

In Labuan, Low acquired administrative experience, fluency in Malay and an enduring reputation as a naturalist, although he quarrelled with geologist/naturalist James Motley. He was Police Magistrate from 1850 to 1877. It was also from Labuan he made his three visits to Mount Kinabalu, the first in March 1851 and twice with Spenser St. John, the consul General of Brunei, in 1858.

Perak
In April 1877, Low was transferred to the Malay Peninsula and became the fourth Resident of Perak. By the terms of the Pangkor Treaty, the Resident was an adviser whose decision were binding in all matters except for custom or religion. The first Resident had been murdered in 1874, precipitating a war that left nearly all high-ranking Malay officials either dead or in exile. Low's appointment marked a return to civil authority.

In his first year, he laid down the principle that in order to retain their right to the mining land that they owned, owners of mining land were obliged to see that their land was worked. Within eight years, he saw slavery abolished in the state. In 1885 he established the first railway line in the Malay Peninsula from Taiping to Port Weld (now Kuala Sepetang). He also helped set up the Journal of the Straits Branch of the Royal Asiatic Society.

In his 12 years in Perak, Low firmly established a peaceful administration. He created a state council that included the principal Malay, Chinese and British leaders and was notably successful in making use of prominent local leaders at most levels of his administration. For example, he cultivated the friendship of mining magnate Kapitan China Chung Keng Quee who was his confidant. Other Chinese miners in Perak were persuaded to use modern British mining equipment by first having Ah Quee experiment with them. So close was this relationship that when Ah Quee was criticized in an article published in Harper's Magazine in 1891, Sir Hugh wrote a letter to the editor to set the record straight. He also worked closely with Raja Yusef (the Raja Muda) and Raja Dris (later Sultan Idris) to restore order, pay off the state's debt of 800,000 Straits Dollars, and re-establish confidence in the British Residential system.

During his time there was a controversy between James Innes, British magistrate in Selangor, and Sir Hugh Low, Resident of Perak, over the issue of debt-slavery in Malaya. Innes attempted to implicate Low, accusing him of abetting the practice of slavery in Perak when he was actually trying to abolish it.

Apart from his administrative achievements, Low was also involved in the experimental planting and research on commercial tropical crops including rubber, coffee, black pepper and tea. Rubber cultivation in Malaysia began with Sir Hugh Low. In 1882 he planted rubber seeds and grew seven trees at the gardens at Kuala Kangsar. Low created a model rubber plantation in Malaya although this is sometimes mis-attributed to Henry Ridley who continued the work after a decade. Low also collected specimens of plants and butterflies from the region.

On 1 August 1885, Sir Hugh Low married Ann Penelope Harriet Douglas, daughter of General Sir Robert Percy Douglas, 4th Baronet and Anne Duckworth.

Retirement
Sir Hugh Low retired from his post as Resident of Perak in 1889, leaving a credit balance of 1.5 million Straits dollars.

Low died on 18 April 1905 in Alassio, Italy.

Honours
 :
  Companion of the Order of St Michael and St George (CMG) (1879)
  Knight Commander of the Order of St Michael and St George (KCMG) - Sir (1883)
  Knight Grand Cross of the Order of St Michael and St George (GCMG) - Sir (1889)

Several species are named to commemorate his work as collector, naturalist and orchidologist:

Plants
Rhododendron lowii, Rhododendron
Nepenthes lowii, pitcher plant 
Vatica lowii
Myristica lowiana

Orchids
Dimorphorchis lowii, Dimorphorchis (originally Vanda, then Arachnis)
Dendrobium lowii, Dendrobium
Paphiopedilum lowii, lady's slipper
Plocoglottis lowii, Plocoglottis
Malaxis lowii, Malaxis
Phalaenopsis lowii

Insects
Sarothrocera lowii, a beetle
Neorina lowii, a butterfly
Papilio lowi, a butterfly

Reptiles
Calamaria lovii [sic], a snake [also attributed to his son]

Mammals
Ptilocercus lowii, pen-tailed treeshrew
Sundasciurus lowii, Low's squirrel

and places:
Low's Peak, the highest peak of Southeast Asia, on Mount Kinabalu, Borneo
Low's Gully
Hugh Low Street, at Ipoh, Perak, Malaysia. The street name has changed to Jalan Sultan Iskandar, but locals still call it Hugh Low Street. It was once a busy two-way street, but since the name change and turning into a one-way street, the street has lost its glamour. There was once an arch; this was removed in 1986 when Hugh Low Street turned into one-way street.

External links 
Hugh Low Hugh Low's work on orchids

Books by Hugh Low
 Sarawak, Its Inhabitants and Productions: Being Notes During a Residence in that Country with His Excellency Mr. Brooke By Hugh Low (1848)
 Sĕlĕsǐlah (book of the Descent) of the Rajas of Brunei By Hugh Low Published by [s.n.], 1880
 The Journal of Sir Hugh Low; Perak, 1887: Perak, 1887 By Hugh Low, transcribed and edited by Emily Sadka Published by Govt. Print. Off., 1955

Papers about Hugh Low
 Sir Hugh Low, G.C.M.G (1824-1905) by Charles F. Cowan in J.Soc.Biblphy.nat.Hist. v.4 pp. 327–343 (1968)

Sources and notes 

1824 births
1905 deaths
English botanists
Administrators in British Malaya
People from British Borneo
History of Perak
Raj of Sarawak
British North Borneo
Companions of the Order of St Michael and St George
Knights Commander of the Order of St Michael and St George
Knights Grand Cross of the Order of St Michael and St George
People from Upper Clapton
English people of Scottish descent